Eswatini competed at the 2020 Summer Olympics in Tokyo. Originally scheduled to take place from 24 July to 9 August 2020, the Games were postponed to 23 July to 8 August 2021, due to the COVID-19 pandemic. Previously known as Swaziland, it was the nation's eleventh appearance at the Summer Olympics since its debut in 1972.

Competitors
The following is the list of number of competitors in the Games.

Athletics

Eswatini received a universality slot from the World Athletics to send a male track and field athlete to the Olympics.

Track & road events

Boxing

Eswatini received an invitation from the Tripartite Commission to send the men's welterweight boxer Thabiso Dlamini to the Olympics, marking the country's return to the sport for the first time since Sydney 2000.

Swimming

Eswatini received a universality invitation from FINA to send two top-ranked swimmers (one per gender) in their respective individual events to the Olympics, based on the FINA Points System of June 28, 2021.

References

Olympics
2020
Nations at the 2020 Summer Olympics